Jenő Hégner-Tóth (17 April 1894 – 10 June 1915) was a Hungarian water polo player who competed in the 1912 Summer Olympics. He was part of the Hungarian team in the 1912 tournament.  He died in Hommona.

References

1894 births
1915 deaths
Hungarian male water polo players
Olympic water polo players of Hungary
Water polo players at the 1912 Summer Olympics
20th-century Hungarian people